Vihi is a village in Põhja-Sakala Parish, Viljandi County in central Estonia, located by the Navesti River. It has a population of 60 (as of 2009).

References

Villages in Viljandi County